Lynn Lewis may refer to:

 Lynn Lewis (judoka), American judoka
 Lynn Lewis (tennis) (born 1963), American tennis player